Siguinonghin is a town in the Solenzo Department of Banwa Province in western Burkina Faso. In 2005, it had a population of 3,683.

References

Populated places in the Boucle du Mouhoun Region
Banwa Province